Belwood (Wright Field) Aerodrome, formerly , was located  west of Belwood, Ontario, Canada.

See also
Belwood (Baird Field) Aerodrome
Belwood (Ellen Field) Aerodrome

References

Centre Wellington
Defunct airports in Ontario